Ambovombe District or Ambovombe-Androy District is a district in the Androy Region, located in southeastern Madagascar.

Communes
The district is further divided into 17 communes:

 Ambanisarike
 Ambazoa
 Ambohimalaza
 Ambonaivo
 Ambondro
 Ambovombe
 Ampamata
 Andalatanosy
 Anjeky Ankilikira
 Antanimora Sud
 Imanombo
 Erada
 Jafaro
 Maroalomainty
 Maroalopoty
 Marovato Befeno
 Sihanamaro

References 

Districts of Androy